Penny Points to Paradise is a 1951 comedy feature film. The film was the feature film debut of the stars of The Goon Show, Spike Milligan, Harry Secombe and Peter Sellers.

The film was directed by Tony Young, who later produced The Telegoons for BBC Television.

Plot
Secombe plays the part of Harry Flakers, a man who has a big win on the football pools. He and his friend Spike Donnelly (Milligan) decide to go to the same shabby seaside boarding house that they have always patronised for their summer holiday, but this year all the other guests (including two young women out to marry money, a dodgy investment advisor and a master forger and assistant) are intent on taking the fortune off them in one way or another.

Ultimately the forgers manage to substitute fake five-pound notes for the real ones that Flakers keeps in his suitcase, but before they can abscond with the money one of the girls is given cash by Flakers to buy some cigarettes, and accused of passing false currency when the forgery is detected. A grand chase follows with half the characters pursuing the other half through a waxwork museum in which the true crooks have taken refuge. Justice is served when the chief forger boasts of his crime in front of what he thinks are two waxwork policemen, but who turn out to be real members of the force.

In the final scenes Harry and Spike marry the two women.

There are sequences featuring a night out at the theatre where a stage hypnotist mesmerises Flakers and the girl Christine into performing an operatic duet, he singing soprano and she baritone, and a scene in which Harry Secombe wordlessly mimes out an entire heart operation being carried out by a nervous surgeon.

Cast
 Harry Secombe as Harry Flakers 
 Alfred Marks as Edward Haynes 
 Peter Sellers as The Major / Arnold Fringe 
 Paddie O'Neil as Christine Russell 
 Spike Milligan as Spike Donnelly 
 Bill Kerr as Digger Graves 
 Freddie Frinton as Drunk 
 Vicki Page as Sheila Gilroy 
 Joe Linnane as Policeman 
 Sam Kydd as Porter / Taxi Driver / Newsvendor

Revival
According to Peter Sellers "a terrifyingly bad film", the film was not profitable on initial release and was eventually re-issued for distribution abroad in 1960 as a cut-down 55-minute version under the title "Penny Points". Many sections were removed, and some additional unrelated material was incorporated from a short comedy entitled "Let's Go Crazy" which had also featured Sellers. A print of this re-issue survived in the National Film and Sound Archive, Australia.

A 16 mm copy of "Penny Points to Paradise" was discovered in 2006 in the archives of Adelphi Films, and in 2007 a 64-minute partial restoration was screened at BFI Southbank. Funding from an American Peter Sellers fan made it possible to attempt a full restoration, using the 16mm print as a reference copy and working from the various incomplete 35 mm archive sources. The resulting 72-minute version was screened by the BFI in July 2009, with a  later DVD release. Vic Pratt, BFI curator, described it as "a cheap and cheerful film that was filmed in just three weeks".

References

External links

 
The Goons films at The Goon Show website
The Goons films at The Telegoons website

1951 films
1951 comedy films
British comedy films
British black-and-white films
1950s English-language films
1950s British films